Jack Briggs may refer to:

 Jack Briggs (broadcaster), American radio broadcaster
 Jack Briggs (cricketer) (1916–1984), English cricketer
 Jack Briggs (actor) (1920–1998), American actor, husband of Ginger Rogers